Straight from New York Pizza (SFNY) is a pizzeria based in the U.S. state of Oregon.

Description 
Straight from New York Pizza (SFNY) is a pizzeria serving New York-style pizza.

History 
Mike Rice and Ian Jacobson opened the first pizzeria in downtown Salem in 1986. Two additional locations opened in Salem within a decade. There were three locations in Portland by 2018:

 Belmont Street in southeast Portland's Sunnyside neighborhood
 West Burnside Street in northwest Portland's Northwest District
 Hawthorne Boulevard in the Sunnyside neighborhood

See also

 Pizza in Portland, Oregon

References

External links 

 
 Straight from New York Pizza at Zomato

1986 establishments in Oregon
Italian-American culture in Oregon
Pizzerias in Oregon
Restaurants established in 1986
Restaurants in Portland, Oregon
Salem, Oregon
Sunnyside, Portland, Oregon
Northwest District, Portland, Oregon